March Revolution may refer to:
 March Revolution (Ecuador) of 1845
 Revolutions of 1848 in the Habsburg areas
 the opening phase of the German revolutions of 1848–49
 February Revolution of 1917 in Russia, which in the modern Gregorian calendar took place in March, but in the Julian calendar that was in use in Russia at the time took place in February.
 Ruhr Uprising of 1920 in the Weimar Republic
 1963 Syrian coup d'état